Vishkin may refer to:
 Uzi Vishkin
 Vishkin, Iran